The U.S.-Japan Council (Beinichi Kaunshiru, USJC) is a 501(c) 3 non-profit educational organization that contributes to strengthening U.S.-Japan relations by bringing together diverse leadership, engaging stakeholders and exploring issues that benefit communities, businesses and government entities on both sides of the Pacific Ocean. It is a Japanese American-led organization, fully dedicated to strengthening ties between the United States and Japan in a global context.

History
USJC was founded in 2009 by Japanese Americans who "saw a need for a conscious effort to ensure a strong relationship with Japan." Central to such an effort was Irene Hirano Inouye, then president and CEO of the Japanese American National Museum, who had been working with the Ministry of Foreign Affairs to introduce Japanese American leaders to Japan through the Japanese American Leadership Delegation.

In 2012, the U.S.-Japan Council (Japan) was created to support the administration of the TOMODACHI Initiative. In 2013, U.S.-Japan Council (Japan) became a Public Interest Corporation (Koeki Zaidan Hojin).

President Barack Obama and Prime Minister Shinzō Abe praised the work of the U.S.-Japan Council in supporting the U.S.-Japan relationship in a Joint Statement issued during their April 2014 Summit.  The Joint Statement particularly highlighted the importance of the Japan American Leadership Delegation and the TOMODACHI Initiative, two of the U.S.-Japan Council's signature programs.

In May 2020, Suzanne Basalla succeeded the late Hirano Inouye as President and CEO of the Council.

Organization
USJC cultivates an international network of Japanese American leaders known as Council Members, and collaborates with other organizations and institutions to develop programs that allow Council Members to engage with their Japanese counterparts and leaders in the United States.

Programs
USJC has several programs, including the USJC Annual Conference, the Japanese American Leadership Delegation program, the Consuls General & Japanese American Leaders Meeting, the Emerging Leaders Program, and Legislative and Business Networking Initiatives.

The Tomodachi Initiative
The Tomodachi Initiative is a public–private partnership between the U.S.-Japan Council and the U.S. Embassy in Tokyo, with support from the Government of Japan. Born out of support for Japan’s recovery from the Great Tohoku earthquake and tsunami in 2011, Tomodachi invests in the next generation of Japanese and American leaders through educational and cultural exchanges as well as leadership programs.

In the aftermath of the Great Tohoku earthquake, USJC created the U.S.-Japan Council Earthquake Relief Fund, which supported the relief and recovery efforts of several NPOs and NGOs in Japan. Ambassador John V. Roos, who was serving in Japan at the time, approached USJC to work with the embassy to implement a public-private partnership. This then became the Tomodachi Initiative.

List of people associated with USJC
 Naoyuki Agawa
 George Aratani
 George Ariyoshi
 Howard Baker
 Gerald Curtis
 Thomas Foley
 Ichiro Fujisaki
 Soichiro Fukutake
 Glen Fukushima
 Ryu Goto
 Colleen Hanabusa
 Ernest Higa
 Mazie Hirono
 Irene Hirano Inouye
 Daniel K. Inouye
 Ryozo Kato
 Fred Katayama
 Takashi Kawamura
 Yohei Kono
 Hiroko Kuniya
 Doris Matsui
 Norman Mineta
 Walter Mondale
 Daniel Okimoto
 Motoatsu Sakurai
 Thomas Schieffer
 George Takei
 Paul Terasaki
 Kristi Yamaguchi
 Roy Yamaguchi
 Jan Yanehiro

See also
 Japanese American Citizens League
 Japanese American National Museum
 Japanese American National Library
 Japanese Cultural Center of Hawaii
 Densho: The Japanese American Legacy Project
 Japanese American Committee for Democracy

References

External links
 Official website
 TOMODACHI Initiative

2009 establishments in Washington, D.C.
Organizations established in 2009
Charities based in Washington, D.C.
Diaspora organizations in the United States
Educational organizations based in Japan
Educational organizations based in the United States
Japan–United States relations
Japanese American
Organizations based in Tokyo